The Bourgogne was a 74-gun ship of the line of the French Navy. She was funded by a don des vaisseaux donation from the Estates of Bourgogne.  She was commissioned in 1772, and served in the squadron of the Mediterranean, with a refit in 1775, and another in 1778.

Career 
On 4 May 1779, off Gibraltar, she took part in a naval action with Victoire against the 32-gun frigates HMS Thetis and Montreal. Montreal was captured, while Thetis managed to escape.

British records largely agree, though they put the encounter on 1 May. When Thetis and Montreal saw two large ships approaching under Dutch colours, they suspected that the strange ships were French and attempted to sail away. Thetis succeeded, but at 9p.m., Bourgogne and Victoire caught up with Montreal, came alongside, and ordered Douglas to send over a boat. Captain Douglas sent over Lieutenant John Douglas, whom the French ordered to Douglas to hail Montreal and instruct her to strike. Captain Douglas attempted to escape, but after the French had fired several broadsides into Montreal he struck.

Bourgogne took part in the American Revolutionary War under Charles de Charritte,  most notably at the Battle of the Chesapeake on 5 September 1781 and at the Battle of the Saintes, where she collided with Duc de Bourgogne

On 11 September 1781 Bourgogne and Aigrette were in the Chesapeake. There they captured the frigate , which the French Navy took into service as Richemont.

Fate
She was wrecked on 4 February 1783, off Curaçao with the loss of 80 of her 840 crew. Captain Champmartin received a three-month suspension as sanction for the loss of the ship.

Sources and references 
 Notes

Citations

Bibliography
 

 

 

Ships of the line of the French Navy
Ships built in France
Shipwrecks in the Caribbean Sea
1766 ships
Maritime incidents in 1783
Don des vaisseaux